Angela Cardoso may refer to:

 Ângela Cardoso (born 1979), Angolan basketball player
 Angela Cardoso (tennis) (born 1980), Portuguese tennis player